Liebenwalde is a town in the Oberhavel district, in Brandenburg, Germany. It is situated 16 km northeast of Oranienburg, and 39 km north of Berlin (centre).

In 2003, the administrative boundaries were expanded to include Freienhagen, Hammer, Kreuzbruch, Liebenthal and Neuholland.

Demography

References

Localities in Oberhavel